Andrea Chiarabini (born 12 March 1995) is an Italian diver. He competed for Italy at the 2012 Summer Olympics and the 2016 Summer Olympics in Rio de Janeiro with Giovanni Tocci.

References

External links
 

Italian male divers
Divers at the 2012 Summer Olympics
Divers at the 2016 Summer Olympics
Olympic divers of Italy
1995 births
Living people
Divers from Rome
Divers of Fiamme Oro